A Night at the Opera is the seventh studio album by the German power metal band Blind Guardian, released in 2002. It is named after the 1975 Queen album of the same name, which is itself named after the Marx brothers film of the same name.

This album continues a stylistic change from power metal into a more progressive sound, with multiple overlaid vocals, choirs, orchestral keys and guitar leads and less emphasis on powerful guitar riffs and heavy rhythms. As a result, drummer Thomen Stauch would leave the group, citing dissatisfaction with the direction the group was going in.

Album content
There are seven different studio versions and two official live versions of "Harvest of Sorrow" – two in English, two in Spanish ("Mies Del Dolor", "La Cosecha Del Dolor"), one in Italian ("Frutto Del Buio"), one in French ("Moisson de Peine"), and one in a mix of all of the versions except the English acoustic and Italian (also called "Harvest of the World").

The song "Battlefield" is featured as the music in the heavy metal edition of the Adult Swim game Robot Unicorn Attack.

Track listing

Lyrical references 
The album features the concepts and themes familiar to Blind Guardian fans, such as historical battles and religious references.

 "Precious Jerusalem" is based on the final days of Jesus of Nazareth and his temptation in the desert.
 "Battlefield" is based on Song of Hildebrandt, an old German tale of a father and son who find themselves in a duel to the death.
 "Under the Ice" has connections to the Iliad, focuses on Cassandra and what happened to her after the Trojan War, particularly from The Oresteia.
 "Sadly Sings Destiny" is based on the religious aspect of the Messiah in the Old Testament, and tells of the crucifixion of Jesus from the point of view of a character who reluctantly helps fulfil the prophecy, by doing such things as building the cross and weaving the Crown of Thorns.
 "The Maiden and the Minstrel Knight" is based on an episode from the story of Tristan und Isolde.
 "The Soulforged" is based on the Dragonlance saga's tales of the mage Raistlin Majere.
 "Age of False Innocence" is about Galileo Galilei.
 "Punishment Divine" is about Nietzsche's decline into insanity where he imagines himself being judged by a court of saints.
 "And Then There Was Silence" is about Cassandra's visions of the coming Trojan War. It was inspired by Homer's Iliad and Odyssey and Virgil's Aeneid.
 "Harvest of Sorrow" is based on Tolkien's tragic story of Túrin Turambar, which appears in the Silmarillion.

Chart positions 
Album – Billboard (North America)

Personnel 

Blind Guardian
 Hansi Kürsch – lead and backing vocals
 André Olbrich – lead, rhythm and acoustic guitars
 Marcus Siepen – rhythm guitar
 Thomen Stauch – drums & percussion

Guest musicians
 Oliver Holzwarth – bass guitar 
 Mathias Wiesner – keyboards & orchestral arrangements
 Michael Schüren – piano on "Age of False Innocence"
 Pad Bender, Boris Schmidt & Sascha Pierro – keyboards and sound effects
 Rolf Köhler, Thomas Hackmann, Olaf Senkbeil & Billy King – The Choir Company

Production
 Charlie Bauerfeind – production, mixing, recording
 Nordin Hammadi Amrani – assistant engineer, additional recordings
 Clemens von Witte – recordings (backing vocals)
 Detlef – recordings (backing vocals)
 Paul Raymond Gregory – cover painting
 André Olbrich – front cover concept
 Dennis "Sir" Kostroman – booklet design
 Axel Jusseit – photos

References 

2002 albums
Blind Guardian albums
Century Media Records albums
Virgin Records albums
Albums produced by Charlie Bauerfeind
Cultural depictions of the Marx Brothers